Fison may refer to:

 Clavering Fison (1892–1985), English businessman and politician
 Frederick Fison (1847–1927), English mill owner and politician
 Joe Fison (1906–1972), Anglican bishop
 Lorimer Fison (1832–1907), Austrian anthropologist
 William Fison (1890–1964), British rower
 Fison baronets, a title in the Baronetage of the United Kingdom

See also
 Fisons, a British multinational pharmaceutical, scientific instruments and horticultural chemicals company
 Phison, a Taiwanese public electronics company